Andrew Thompson (born April 30, 1980) is an American football coach and former player. He assumed the position as the head football coach at Sacramento State in December 2022.

Head coaching record

References

External links
 Sacramento State profile

1980 births
Living people
American football safeties
Montana Grizzlies football players
Eastern Oregon Mountaineers football coaches
Northern Arizona Lumberjacks football coaches
Sacramento State Hornets football coaches
Coaches of American football from Washington (state)
Players of American football from Washington (state)